Vibhavadi Rangsit Road or Highway 31, often informally called Vibhavadi Road, is a highway in Thailand.

The road begins at Phaya Thai district in Bangkok and crosses Chatuchak, Lak Si, and Don Mueang districts before merging with Phahonyothin Road (Highway 1) at Khu Khot subdistrict, Lam Luk Ka district, Pathum Thani Province.

Vibhavadi Rangsit Road is a superhighway through Bangkok with no traffic lights. It is a divided highway, with each side further divided into a main road and a frontage road. Major roads that Vibhavadi Rangsit Road intersects are Din Daeng Road (its point of origin), Sutthisan Road, Lat Phrao Road, Phahonyothin Road, Ngamwongwan Road (Highway 302), and Chaengwatthana Road (Highway 304).

It is named in honor of HRH Princess Vibhavadi Rangsit (1920–1977), a well-known Thai novelist who dedicated the final decade of her life to developing rural Southern Thailand, and was killed in an attack by insurgents while trying to rescue injured Border Patrol police. Prior to the renaming of Highway No. 31 as Vibhavadi Rangsit Road, it was commonly known as "Superhighway Road" (Thanon Superhighway).

The section between Chaeng Watthana Road and Don Mueang Airport is also part of the former local road Si Rap Suk Road, which runs from Lak Si Monument to the airport.

Vibhavadi Rangsit Road between Din Daeng Intersection and Khlong Bang Sue forms the border between Din Daeng and Phaya Thai districts in Bangkok.

The Uttaraphimuk Elevated Tollway, better known as Don Mueang Tollway runs high above the road and is a toll expressway in Bangkok.

National highways in Thailand
Streets in Bangkok